The 1969 Gent–Wevelgem was the 31st edition of the Gent–Wevelgem cycle race and was held on 16 April 1969. The race started in Ghent and finished in Wevelgem. The race was won by Willy Vekemans of the  team.

General classification

References

Gent–Wevelgem
1969 in road cycling
1969 in Belgian sport
March 1969 sports events in Europe